Wielmierzowice  is a village in the administrative district of Gmina Zdzieszowice, within Krapkowice County, Opole Voivodeship, in south-western Poland.

Gallery

References

Villages in Krapkowice County